Basta is a Vidhan Sabha constituency of Balasore district, Odisha.

Area of this constituency includes Baliapal block and 11 GPs (Mukulishi, Brahmanda, Sadanandapur, Baharda, Rautpada, Mathani, Sahada, Naikudi, Gadapada, Darada and Irda) of Basta block.

In 2014 election, Biju Janata Dal candidate Nityananda Sahu defeated Indian National Congress candidate Jaynarayan Mohanty margin of 6433 votes.

Elected Members

Sixteen(16) elections held during 1951 to 2014. Elected members from the Basta constituency are:

2019: (37) : Nityananda Sahoo (Biju Janata Dal)
2014: (37): Nityananda Sahoo (BJD)
2009: (37): Raghunath Mohanty (BJD)
2004: (13): Raghunath Mohanty (BJD)
2000: (13): Raghunath Mohanty (BJD)
1995: (13): Raghunath Mohanty (Janata Dal)
1990: (13): Raghunath Mohanty (Janata Dal)
1985: (13): Bhupal Chandra Mahapatra  (Congress)
1980: (13): Bhupal Chandra Mahapatra  (Congress-I)
1977: (13): Maheswar Baug (Janata Party)
1974: (13): Chintamani Jena  (Congress)
1971: (13): Chintamani Jena  (Utkal Congress)
1967: (13): Chintamani Jena  (Congress)
1961: (128): Maheswar Baug (PSP)
1958: (Bye-election): Akshaya Narayan Praharaj (Congress)
1957: (91): Akshaya Narayan Praharaj (Congress)
1951: (53): Trilochan Senapati (Congress)

2019 Election Result

2014 Election Result
In 2014 election, Biju Janata Dal candidate Nityananda Sahoo defeated Indian National Congress candidate Jay Narayan Mohanty by a margin of 6,433 votes.

Summary of results of the 2009 Election

Notes

References

Assembly constituencies of Odisha
Balasore district